Isabel Caroline Ebel aka Isabel Caroline Hines (October 4, 1908 – November 3, 1992) was an American who was the first woman student at MIT and NYU studying aeronautical engineering.

Early life and education
Ebel was born in Kings County, New York on October 4, 1908, daughter of Arthur R Ebel, Assistant Commissioner of Public Works in Brooklyn.  

She was not the first woman involved in aero engineering as one of the Wright Brothers company was Katharine Wright. Katherine was the only person in the Wright family to have a degree but it was not in engineering. Elsie MacGill gained a masters in aeronautical engineering in 1929.

Ebel gained her degree in aeronautical engineering at the Massachusetts Institute of Technology in 1932. Ebel wanted to use her degree but she had difficulty in finding employment. One task she did take on, was to assist Amelia Earhart when she was planning one of her record-breaking flights. Ebel decided to study more and she applied to the Guggenheim School of Engineering at New York University. It was said that she was only accepted because Earhart interceded with the admission staff on her behalf.

Career 
When she qualified in 1934 she was annoyed at the attention she was getting because she was only being noted for being "a freak". Ebel asked the question "Why wouldn't a girl study aeronautical engineering?", but the reporter for the Brooklyn Daily Eagle did not answer. Her reply was difficulty again in finding a relevant job. In 1937, she was included in an article by M. Elsa Gardner on Women Engineers in the journal of the Women's Engineering Society, alongside Kate Gleeson, Elsie MacGill, Frances Hurd Clark, Mary Olga Soroka, Marie Lurhing, Marie Reith, Olive Dennis, Margaret Ingels, Hilda Lyon and Amy Johnson. In 1939 war broke out in Europe and she gained a job at the Grumman Aircraft Corporation where she helped with several aircraft but in particular the Grumman XF5F Skyrocket. 

Ebel went on to work at smaller companies before she became a research engineer for United Airlines. in 1942. In the following year she was being highlighted by the Christian Science Monitor as the only woman aeronautical engineer employed by United. 

She was discriminated against when finding employment, but she noted that once she had the job then being a woman was no hindrance (or help) in doing the work.

Death and legacy
Ebel died in Santa Barbara in 1992. In 2016 MIT made a video about the contribution of MIT women to aerospace engineering. They noted that there was then 48% women aerospace graduates but the story started with Isabel Ebel - who had taken years to get a job.

References

External links 
 Aero Astro Pioneers by MIT

1908 births
1992 deaths
People from Brooklyn
Aeronautical engineers
Massachusetts Institute of Technology alumni
New York University alumni
Women engineers
American women engineers